Hotel Fontenelle was an upscale hotel located at 1806 Douglas Street in downtown Omaha, Nebraska. Designed by noted architect Thomas Rogers Kimball in the Late Gothic Revival style, it opened in 1915 and was demolished in 1983. It was named after Logan Fontenelle, an interpreter for the Omaha Tribe when it ceded land to the U.S. government which became the city of Omaha.

History
The Fontenelle opened on February 15, 1915. Costing $1 million to build, it was funded largely by citizen subscribers, which was a common method for financing hotels at the time.  The building was designed by Thomas Kimball for the Douglas Hotel Company and its president, Gurdon W. Wattles. The building had 350 guest rooms decorated in an English style, and public areas appointed with marble floors and mahogany paneling.

The Fontenelle was operated by the Douglas Hotel Company until 1920, after which it was acquired by hotel magnate Gene Eppley, becoming the flagship of his Eppley Hotel Company, which in the 1950s was the largest privately held hotel company in the US.  Eppley operated 22 units in six states and lived in the Fontenelle after buying it in 1920, and died there in 1958.

The center of Omaha society, the hotel was the site of numerous civic events, weddings and conventions.  These included the founding of the Girl Scout movement in Omaha. a national women's bowling tournament, and lectures by Willa Cather and other nationally known authors.

Eppley sold his hotel empire to Sheraton Hotels, for thirty million dollars in 1956. It was the second largest hotel sale in United States history. The hotel became the Sheraton-Fontenelle and continued to be a popular destination for social events. Sheraton sold the hotel, along with seventeen other aging properties, to Gotham Hotels in 1968 and it regained its original name. The hotel was headquarters for Senator Robert F. Kennedy's 1968 Democratic Nebraska primary campaign.

The hotel closed on February 28, 1971. It had faded in popularity as the city grew westward and the structure's condition was also deteriorating. Many attempts were made to redevelop the Fontenelle as it stood empty over the next twelve years, but it was eventually demolished in the spring of 1983. The site is now the parking lot of the Roman L. Hruska Federal Courthouse.

Notable guests
The Fontenelle hosted many celebrities and politicians through the years, including Lou Gehrig and Babe Ruth, President Harry S. Truman, who was a personal friend of Gene Eppley. Senator John F. Kennedy and his wife Jacqueline stayed there during his campaign for the 1960 Presidential election.

See also
 History of Omaha
 Yule Marble

References

Hotel buildings completed in 1915
Hotel Fontenelle
Demolished hotels in Omaha, Nebraska
Hotel Fontenelle
Hotel Fontenelle
Hotel Fontenelle
Hotels established in 1915
Former skyscrapers
Hotel Fontenelle
Hotel Fontenelle
Skyscraper hotels in Nebraska
Sheraton hotels